Pakala Junction railway station (station code: PAK) is a railway station serving Pakala, Tirupati district, Andhra Pradesh,  517112, India.

Administration 
The station comes under the jurisdiction of Guntakal railway division of South Coast Railways.

Infrastructure 
The station has three platforms.

Line and location 
This station is situated in Gudur–Katpadi branch line with a branch line connecting to Dharmavaram.

References

External links

Guntakal railway division
Railway junction stations in Andhra Pradesh
Railway stations in Tirupati district